Joseph Laws McKibben (1912 – 2001) was an American physicist and engineer who worked with J. Robert Oppenheimer as a group leader on the Manhattan Project. He personally witnessed the Trinity test and  flipped the switch that set off the atomic bomb at Trinity. McKibben, motivated by his daughter Karan's paralysed hands due to polio, also invented the Air Muscle in 1957.

He was born in 1912 in Missouri. He died in 2001 in Los Alamos, aged 89.

References

External links 
 http://cyberneticzoo.com/bionics/1957-artificial-muscle-joseph-laws-mckibben-american/

 https://www.washingtonpost.com/archive/lifestyle/1980/06/29/the-sweet-sin-of-the-atomic-city/9c9752cb-324a-45cf-a948-2ab5528f8fee/
 https://www.nytimes.com/1983/10/03/us/for-45-scientists-a-revisiting-of-site-of-first-atomic-blast.html
 https://www.abqjournal.com/trinity/trinity1.htm
 https://naturalphilosophy.org/home/member/?memberid=256&subpage=about
 https://www.aip.org/history-programs/niels-bohr-library/photos/mckibben-joseph-d1
 https://billiongraves.com/grave/Joseph-Laws-McKibben/9720563?referrer=myheritage
 https://peoplelegacy.com/joseph_laws_mckibben-271p2.

1912 births
2001 deaths
University of Wisconsin–Madison alumni
20th-century American physicists
American nuclear physicists
Manhattan Project people
People from Los Alamos, New Mexico
University of Wisconsin–Madison faculty
Particle physicists
Scientists from Missouri
Fellows of the American Physical Society